Percy William Bunting (1 February 1836 – 22 July 1911) was an English journalist.

Biography

He was born at Radcliffe, Lancashire, son of Eliza and Thomas Percival Bunting, and grandson of Wesleyan divine Jabez Bunting. A younger sister was Sarah Maclardie Amos.

He was educated at Owen's College, Manchester, and Pembroke College, Cambridge, where, in 1859, he was classed as 21st wrangler. Three years later he was called to the bar at Lincoln's Inn. In 1882, he became editor of The Contemporary Review, and henceforth devoted himself to journalism, becoming also editor of the Methodist Times from 1902 to 1907, in succession to Hugh Price Hughes. In July 1908 he was knighted. Throughout his life, he was an active supporter of Wesleyan Methodism. He lived at Endsleigh Gardens in Bloomsbury, London.

He married on 21 June 1869 Mary Hyett (1840–1919), elder sister of Elizabeth Lidgett. Their son Sidney Percival Bunting became a leader of the South African Communist Party.

Bunting died on 22nd July 1911 and was buried on the western side of Highgate Cemetery.

Notes

References

External links
Guide to the Sir Percy William Bunting Papers 1882-1911 at the University of Chicago Special Collections Research Center 

1836 births
1911 deaths
Burials at Highgate Cemetery
British male journalists
British Methodists
Journalists from Manchester
Alumni of Pembroke College, Cambridge
Members of Lincoln's Inn